Thunder and Lightning is the twelfth and final studio album by Irish hard rock band Thin Lizzy, released on 4 March 1983. Guitarist John Sykes was hired to replace Snowy White after 1981's Renegade, and Sykes helped to provide a heavier sound and guitar tone than Thin Lizzy had used on previous albums. However, the bulk of the songwriting (except for "Cold Sweat") was completed before he joined the band. Keyboard player Darren Wharton also offered a stronger musical influence to Thin Lizzy's final studio album, co-writing many of the tracks including "Some Day She Is Going to Hit Back", and the final single "The Sun Goes Down". A farewell tour followed the album's release, followed by the live album Life. The group's co-founder, frontman and bass player Phil Lynott died in 1986.

Reception 

AllMusics Greg Prato proclaimed Thunder and Lightning "a definite improvement" compared to much of their other output in the 1980s, but remarked that the record was not the "best release" by the band.

Track listings

The limited edition double LP and cassette version of the album adds four tracks, recorded live in Britain while Snowy White was still a member of the band. 

2013 Deluxe Edition
In 2013, a deluxe edition of the album was released. It consisted of two discs: disc one included the original release, and disc two contained live recordings from a 1981 Hammersmith Odeon show and a number of demos.

Tracks 1–6 recorded live in 1981 at the Hammersmith Odeon, London, 27 November 1981.
Tracks 1–2 originally issued as B-sides on the "Cold Sweat" single.
Tracks 3–6 originally included as bonus tracks on double LP and cassette versions of the album.
Tracks 7–15 are original album demo versions.

Singles
"Cold Sweat" / "Bad Habits" – 4 February 1983
A double single pack and 12" were also released, the other tracks being "Angel of Death" (live) / "Don't Believe a Word" (live).
"Thunder and Lightning" / "Still in Love with You" (live) – April 1983
A 12" was also released, featuring the same two tracks and a poster.
"The Sun Goes Down" / "Baby Please Don't Go" – July 1983
The B-side in the Netherlands was "Bad Habits".
 "The Sun Goes Down (Remix)" / "The Sun Goes Down (Extended)" / "Baby Please Don't Go" – 12" (1983)

Personnel
Thin Lizzy
Phil Lynott – bass guitar, vocals
Scott Gorham – guitar, backing vocals
John Sykes – guitar, backing vocals
Darren Wharton – keyboards, backing vocals
Brian Downey – drums, percussion

Production
Chris Tsangarides – producer, engineer, mixing
Andrew Warwick – engineer
Chris Ludwinski – tape op, assistant engineer
Ian Cooper – mastering at Townhouse Studios, London

Charts
 

Album

SinglesCold SweatThunder and LightningThe Sun Goes Down'

Certifications

References 

Thin Lizzy albums
1983 albums
Albums produced by Chris Tsangarides
Vertigo Records albums
Warner Records albums